Spyder is an open-source cross-platform integrated development environment (IDE) for scientific programming in the Python language. Spyder integrates with a number of prominent packages in the scientific Python stack, including NumPy, SciPy, Matplotlib, pandas, IPython, SymPy and Cython, as well as other open-source software. It is released under the MIT license.

Initially created and developed by Pierre Raybaut in 2009, since 2012 Spyder has been maintained and continuously improved by a team of scientific Python developers and the community.

Spyder is extensible with first-party and third-party plugins, includes support for interactive tools for data inspection and embeds Python-specific code quality assurance and introspection instruments, such as Pyflakes, Pylint and Rope. It is available cross-platform through Anaconda, on Windows, on macOS through MacPorts, and on major Linux distributions such as Arch Linux, Debian, Fedora, Gentoo Linux, openSUSE and Ubuntu.

Spyder uses Qt for its GUI and is designed to use either of the PyQt or PySide Python bindings. QtPy, a thin abstraction layer developed by the Spyder project and later adopted by multiple other packages, provides the flexibility to use either backend.

Features 
Features include:

An editor with syntax highlighting, introspection, code completion
Support for multiple IPython consoles
The ability to explore and edit variables from a GUI
A Help pane able to retrieve and render rich text documentation on functions, classes and methods automatically or on-demand
A debugger linked to IPdb, for step-by-step execution
Static code analysis, powered by Pylint
A run-time Profiler, to benchmark code
Project support, allowing work on multiple development efforts simultaneously
A built-in file explorer, for interacting with the filesystem and managing projects
A "Find in Files" feature, allowing full regular expression search over a specified scope
An online help browser, allowing users to search and view Python and package documentation inside the IDE
A history log, recording every user command entered in each console
An internal console, allowing for introspection and control over Spyder's own operation

Plugins 
Available plugins include:

Spyder-Unittest, which integrates the popular unit testing frameworks Pytest, Unittest and Nose with Spyder
Spyder-Notebook, allowing the viewing and editing of Jupyter Notebooks within the IDE
Download Spyder Notebook
Using conda: conda install spyder-notebook -c spyder-ide
Using pip: pip install spyder-notebook

Spyder-Reports, enabling use of literate programming techniques in Python
Spyder-Terminal, adding the ability to open, control and manage cross-platform system shells within Spyder
Download Spyder Terminal
Using conda: conda install spyder-terminal -c spyder-ide
Using pip: pip install spyder-terminal

Spyder-Vim, containing commands and shortcuts emulating the Vim text editor
Spyder-AutoPEP8, which can automatically conform code to the standard PEP 8 code style
Spyder-Line-Profiler and Spyder-Memory-Profiler, extending the built-in profiling functionality to include testing an individual line, and measuring memory usage

See also 

List of integrated development environments for Python programming language

References

External links 

Documentation

Free integrated development environments
Free integrated development environments for Python
Free mathematics software
Free science software
Python (programming language) development tools
Python (programming language) software
Software using the MIT license